Mamie Evelyn Locke (born March 19, 1954) is an American politician and educator. A Democrat, she was a member of the Hampton, Virginia city council 1996–2004, and mayor 2000–2004.

Education
Locke received a B.A. degree in history and political science from Tougaloo College in 1976. She then attended Atlanta University for advanced political science studies, receiving an M.A. in 1978 and a Ph.D. in 1984. She also completed a program in Middle Eastern studies at the American University in Cairo in 1986.

Political career
Locke was first elected to Hampton City Council in 1996. The council chose her as Vice Mayor in 1998 and Mayor in 2000.

In 2003, she won a three-way Democratic primary for the 2nd Senate district nomination with 48.11% of the vote. She then won the general election over Republican P. K. Bomersheim and independent J. B. Hobson with 64.75%.

In 2007, Locke was unopposed in her re-election bid.

In 2011, she defeated Republican Tom E. Harmon IV with 65.39% of the vote.

Notes

External links

Project Vote Smart - Senator Mamie E. Locke (VA) profile
Follow the Money - Mamie Locke
2005 2003 campaign contributions

1954 births
Living people
Democratic Party Virginia state senators
Mayors of Hampton, Virginia
Virginia city council members
Women mayors of places in Virginia
Women state legislators in Virginia
Hampton University faculty
People from Brandon, Mississippi
Tougaloo College alumni
Clark Atlanta University alumni
The American University in Cairo alumni
20th-century American politicians
21st-century American politicians
African-American state legislators in Virginia
20th-century American women politicians
21st-century American women politicians
Women city councillors in Virginia
African-American mayors in Virginia
American women academics
20th-century African-American women
20th-century African-American politicians
21st-century African-American women
21st-century African-American politicians
African-American women mayors